Shinee World may refer to:

 Shinee World (concert), the first independent concert tour by South Korean boy group Shinee
 Shinee World (album), a live album by Shinee
 Shinee World (DVD), a DVD by Shinee
 Shinee World or Shawols, the fanbase of South Korean boy group Shinee

See also
 Shinee World 2012
 Shinee World 2013